Henry Cook Baker D.C.M., M.S.M., Q.S.A.M (eight bars) was a sergeant in the 18th (Queen Mary's Own) Hussars during the Boer War from 1899 to 1902. The period 1899 to 1902 is also known as the Second Boer War. He was honorably discharged after 17 and half years service after being severely wounded near a farm called Roodepoort close by Waterval Boven down towards the Lowveld. During this engagement he made an attempt to save the life of Lieutenant Cawston of Norwich, who, despite his efforts eventually died of his wounds. Sergeant Baker was so badly wounded his right arm had to be amputated. 

A PART OF MAJOR LAMING'S REPORT ON THIS
SKIRMISH.To BRIGADE MAJOR CAMPBELL’S FORCE
Zandbank, 1st March, 1901
Sir,-I have the honour to bring forward the names of the undermentioned
non-commissioned officer and man for special service
rendered at Roodepoort by them on 2 February 1901, together with
particulars of the case.
No. 2,703, Sergeant H. Baker. This non-commissioned officer was
with Lieut. Cawston and his troop when that officer was mortally
wounded, and four men were killed and four wounded out of the troop
of some twenty men. Sergeant Baker himself was among the latter,
and lost his right arm through amputation on account of the wound
he received. Lieut. Cawston had halted his troop, and had himself
ridden up close to the leading scouts to examine the position. Sergeant
Baker acted independently with great judgment in dismounting the
men of the troop on information he received from one of the scouts,
who reported the Boers close by hidden by a fold of the ground.
Hardly had he done so when a very hot fire was opened on the troop,
causing Lieut. Cawston and several men to fall, on which Sergeant
Baker rallied together the remainder of his men and withstood the
Boers, who were advancing most determinedly, thereby enabling a
counter attack to be delivered by a section of King's Royal Rifles
Mounted Infantry, who were in close support, which successfully
drove the Boers off. I consider that Sergeant Baker's conduct is
specially deserving of mention, aa he  suffering at the time from a
very severe wound. He has throughout the war proved himself to be
a gallant man, and I believe was specially commended by Major-
General Howard for services performed when attached to his staff at
Mwrzicht in July, 1900, but this recommendation was not forwarded
through the regiment.

From the 18th HUSSARS IN SOUTH AFRICA The Records of a Cavalry Regiment During the Boer War by  Major Charles Burnett

He fought in nearly every major engagement in South Africa and was with Lord Roberts at the siege of Ladysmith. He was mentioned in Lord Robert's Despatch on 4 September 1901, and Lord Kitchener's Despatch on 28 July 1901. Sergeant Baker served in the Sudan, Egypt, and the North-West Frontier of India. Upon arrival in South Africa from India he had already been mentioned twice in dispatches for acts of bravery. He became the Regiments crack shot (retaining this honour for nearly 20 years), fencing champion and won the Regimental heavy-weight boxing championship. Later he became an instructor at the Cavalry School in Aldershot and founding member of the Carlton branch of the British Legion.

References

British Army personnel of the Second Boer War